The 2020 National Premier Soccer League season was part of the 108th season of FIFA-sanctioned soccer in the United States and the 18th season of the National Premier Soccer League (NPSL). Miami FC, the defending league champions, left in the off-season and joined the National Independent Soccer Association and later the USL Championship.

On March 26, the season was cancelled due to the COVID-19 pandemic.

Changes from 2019
Multiple changes were made to the league's conferences ahead of the season. The Northeast Region was renamed to the "East Region." The Southeast Conference was moved from the South Region to the East Region and the Midwest Region's East Conference was renamed the “Rust Belt Conference.”

A new conference, the Gulf Coast Conference, was announced on November 12, 2019. It would include new teams, mostly from the Gulf Coast Premier League, Jacksonville Armada U-23 from the Sunshine Conference, and the returning New Orleans Jesters.

Teams

Incoming teams

Moved and/or rebranded teams

Outgoing teams

2020 teams

Standings and results
Only two of the three West Region conferences had begun play prior to the season being cancelled.

West Region

Southwest Conference

Golden Gate Conference

Members Cup 
The league intends to hold the second edition of its Members Cup tournament in autumn 2020, beginning in mid-August and concluding with the 2020 NPSL Members Cup Final in November. On July 16, the league announced a four team tournament hosted by Erie Commodores FC, and including 2019 National Semifinalist Cleveland SC, along with FC Buffalo and Pittsburgh Hotspurs. Pittsburgh won the "Rust Belt Group" on July 29 with a win over the Commodores.

In addition, the July 29 match between Buffalo and Cleveland also served as a group stage game for the 2020 NISA Independent Cup, which both teams were also taking part in alongside former NPSL member Detroit City FC in that tournament's "Great Lakes Region".

Teams

Standings

Fixtures and results

See also
2020 U.S. Open Cup
2020 Hank Steinbrecher Cup

References

External links
Official National Premier Soccer League website

 
National Premier Soccer League seasons
United States